Sören Willy Ernfrid Sjösten (born 12 December 1938, Krylbo, Sweden, died 1999) was a motorcycle speedway rider. He won the world pairs championship in 1974 with Anders Michanek and became world team champion three times representing Sweden, in 1962, 1964 and 1970. Sjösten also appeared in six individual World Championship Finals with two bronze medals as best result. Both third places was received after losing race-off heats for silver medal, the first time to Barry Briggs and the second time to Ivan Mauger

Sjösten rode for Masarna, Vargarna and Bysarna in the Swedish leagues and for Belle Vue Aces, Wolverhampton Wolves and Bristol Bulldogs in the British League. An excellent starter, he was renowned for having a 'wild' style of riding with the rear of the bike sliding further out on the bends than is usual and was often considered rough on his opponents.

He retired after his brother Christer was killed in a meeting in Brisbane, Australia in 1979.

World final appearances

Individual World Championship
 1962 -  London, Wembley Stadium - 9th - 8pts
 1965 -  London, Wembley Stadium - 7th - 9pts
 1969 -  London, Wembley Stadium - 3rd - 11pts
 1970 -  Wroclaw, Olympic Stadium - 4th - 9pts
 1971 -  Göteborg, Ullevi - 8th - 8pts
 1974 -  Göteborg, Ullevi - 3rd - 11pts

World Pairs Championship
 1974 -  Manchester, Hyde Road (with Anders Michanek) - Winner - 28pts (14)

World Team Cup
 1961 -  Wrocław, Olympic Stadium (with Ove Fundin / Rune Sörmander / Björn Knutsson / Per Tage Svensson) - 2nd - 30pts (2)
 1962 -  Slaný (with Björn Knutsson / Ove Fundin / Göte Nordin / Rune Sörmander) - Winner - 36pts (10)
 1964 -  Abensberg, Abensberg Stadion (with Ove Fundin / Björn Knutsson / Göte Nordin / Rune Sörmander) - Winner - 34pts (0)
 1969 -  Rybnik, Rybnik Municipal Stadium (with Bengt Jansson / Ove Fundin / Anders Michanek / Torbjörn Harrysson) - 4th - 12pts (2)
 1970 -  London, Wembley Stadium (with Bengt Jansson / Ove Fundin / Anders Michanek) - Winner - 42pts (10)
 1971 -  Wrocław, Olympic Stadium (with Anders Michanek / Bernt Persson /  Bengt Jansson / Leif Enecrona) - 4th - 18pts
 1974 -  Chorzów, Silesian Stadium (with Anders Michanek / Tommy Jansson / Christer Lofqvist) - 2nd - 31pts (10)
 1975 -  Norden, Motodrom Halbemond (with Anders Michanek / Tommy Jansson / Bernt Persson / Sören Karlsson) - 3rd - 17pts (1)

References

External links
 Belle Vue Ace: Sören Sjösten
 https://wwosbackup.proboards.com/thread/2795

1938 births
1999 deaths
People from Avesta Municipality
Swedish speedway riders
Speedway World Pairs Champions
Belle Vue Aces riders
Birmingham Brummies riders
Wolverhampton Wolves riders
Bristol Bulldogs riders
Sportspeople from Dalarna County